Azizabad (also Romanized as ‘Azīzābād; also known as Karūn Kesh) is a village in Palanga Rural District, Shahrud District, Khalkhal County, Ardabil Province, Iran. At the 2006 census, its population was 50, in 12 families.

References 

Towns and villages in Khalkhal County